The Cathedral of Our Lady of the Assumption, located in the city of Oaxaca de Juarez, Oaxaca, Mexico, is the seat of the Roman Catholic Archdiocese of Antequera, Oaxaca. Its construction began circa 1535 and it was consecrated on 12 July 1733. It is dedicated to Our Lady of the Assumption.

History 

Construction began in 1535, during which the Temple of San Juan de Dios temporarily served as the cathedral church of the diocese.  In 1640, the cathedral was installed and the seat of the diocese was transferred to Our Lady of the Assumption. Due to earthquakes in the 16th and 18th centuries, the cathedral had to be reconstructed several times, with the most recent reconstruction beginning in 1702 and finishing in 1733.

Structure
Its facade is made of green cantera stone commonly found in Oaxaca's buildings, and the interior is in Neoclassical style. The altar features a statue of Our Lady of the Assumption (Nuestra Señora de la Asunción) which was made in Italy during the Porfirian era, who is represented by a bronze sculpture brought from Europe and made by Tadoini.

The towers of the cathedral are not the originals, as they were destroyed in the 1931 Oaxaca earthquake. In the south wing there is a clock donated to Oaxaca by King Fernando VII. The Lord of Lightning is in the last chapel on the left, while the second on the right contains the remains of the Cross of Huatulco.  Atop the west wall of the quire is a locally built baroque pipe organ, parts of which date to 1711–1712, restored in 1997.

References

Footnotes

External links 
Catholichierarchy.org: Archdiocese of Antequera – Oaxaca webpage
Oaxaca-mio.com: History and description of the cathedral—

Churches in Oaxaca
Oaxaca
.
Roman Catholic churches completed in 1733
1730s establishments in Mexico
1733 establishments in New Spain
17th-century architecture in Mexico
18th-century Roman Catholic church buildings in Mexico
Baroque church buildings in Mexico
Renaissance architecture in Mexico
Spanish Colonial architecture in Mexico